This is a list of the 25 members of the European Parliament for the Greece in the 1999 to 2004 session.

List

Notes

Greece
List
1999